Sázava is the name of a river in Bohemia, Czech Republic, and a number of localities named after the river:

Sázava (river)
Sázava (town), a town in the Central Bohemian Region 
Sázava Monastery in Sázava
Sázava (Ústí nad Orlicí District), a municipality and village in the Pardubice Region
Sázava (Žďár nad Sázavou District), a municipality and village in the Vysočina Region
Sázava, a village and administrative part of Davle in the Central Bohemian Region
Sázava, a village and administrative part of Nový Rychnov in the Vysočina Region

See also
Procopius of Sázava, Czech saint